Downtown Berkeley station is an underground Bay Area Rapid Transit (BART) station in Berkeley, California. The station serves Downtown Berkeley and the surrounding areas.

History

Southern Pacific 
The Central Pacific Railroad opened its Berkeley Branch Railroad to the intersection of Shattuck and University Avenues on August 16, 1876. Early civic leader Francis K. Shattuck donated land for the railroad and its depot, and subsidized the initial construction. Berkeley was the terminus of the line until 1878, when it was extended northwest along Shattuck. The Central Pacific was leased by the Southern Pacific Railroad (SP) in 1885, then transferred to its Northern Railway subsidiary in 1888. The first Berkeley station was a small wooden building at the northwest corner of Center Street and Shattuck; it was replaced in the 1890s by a slightly larger by still modest station.

On October 26, 1903, the Key System began electric commuter rail operation from Berkeley to the San Francisco ferries – a direct threat to the SP's steam-hauled trains – on a line that paralleled the SP tracks on Shattuck. Around that time, Cal president Benjamin Ide Wheeler and other prominent Berkeley academics lobbied SP president E. H. Harriman for an improved train station to complement John Galen Howard's emerging architectural style for the nearby University of California, Berkeley.  Finally, the devastating 1906 earthquake and subsequent rebuilding "served as a powerful incentive to expedite the project".

Surveying work began in June 1906; that September, SP management announced their intentions to convert their suburban lines to a frequent electric service to compete with the Key System. The new station, an elegant red brick structure with buff terracotta trim, red tile roof, and a colonnade, opened on April 9, 1908. It was officially designed by SP architect Daniel J. Patterson in a similar style to Émile Bénard's original plans for the university, though the high quality of its design and circumstantial evidence led some historians to believe it was actually designed by Howard. The SP lines were fully electrified in 1911.

BART 

Downtown Berkeley opened on January 29, 1973, as part of the extension from MacArthur to Richmond, with service southward to Fremont until the opening of the Transbay Tube and subsequent service to San Francisco later that year. The station was designed by Maher & Martens of San Francisco in collaboration with Parsons Brinckerhoff, Tudor Construction, and Bechtel.

In 1995, BART changed the name of the station from "Berkeley" to "Downtown Berkeley" in an effort to minimize confusion between this station and North Berkeley.

Removal of rotunda 

A station and plaza renovation project began construction on August 29, 2016 and opened to the public on October 19, 2018. The new plaza includes new lighting, landscaping, drainage, paving, and bus shelters in the overground plaza of the station. The old main rotunda entrance has been removed and was replaced by a glass entrance structure similar to those in Downtown Oakland. The $11.2 million project is funded primarily by BART, with additional funding from the City of Berkeley, Metropolitan Transportation Commission, and Alameda County. A further project to renovate the underground station interior is in the planning stages.

The entrances on the southern end of the station were closed from April 13, 2020, to June 12, 2021, due to low ridership during the COVID-19 pandemic.

Station layout 
Like most underground BART stations, Downtown Berkeley has two levels: a mezzanine containing the faregates and an island platform with two tracks. Access to the station is provided by five street-level entrances on Shattuck Avenue, with two at Addison Street and Allston Way each and one at the southwest corner of Shattuck Avenue and Center Street. The escalators at the latter were topped by an 24-sided rotunda featuring artwork of the UC Botanical Garden.

References

External links 

Downtown Berkeley station overview

Bay Area Rapid Transit stations in Alameda County, California
Stations on the Orange Line (BART)
Stations on the Red Line (BART)
Buildings and structures in Berkeley, California
Railway stations in California at university and college campuses
Railway stations in the United States opened in 1973